Judson Dance Theater was a collective of dancers, composers, and visual artists who performed at the Judson Memorial Church in Greenwich Village, Manhattan New York City between 1962 and 1964. The artists involved were avant garde experimentalists who rejected the confines of Modern dance practice and theory, inventing as they did the precepts of Postmodern dance.

History 
Judson Dance Theater grew out of a composition class held at Merce Cunningham's studio, taught by Robert Dunn, a musician who had studied experimental music theory with John Cage. A Concert of Dance, the first Judson concert, took place on July 6, 1962, and included the work of 14 choreographers performed by 17 people, some of whom were students in the Dunn composition class. Other performers in the concert were members of the Merce Cunningham Dance Company, as well as visual artists, filmmakers, and composers. The concert included works by Yvonne Rainer, Steve Paxton, David Gordon, Alex and Deborah Hay, Fred Herko, Elaine Summers, William Davis, and Ruth Emerson.

Beginning in the Fall of 1962, the group held weekly workshops at which they performed and received critiques. These meetings were held first at Yvonne Rainer's studio, then at the Judson Memorial Church. Throughout the next two years, nearly two hundred works were presented by the collective. The name Judson Dance Theater was adopted in April 1963. Members also independently participated in performance and multimedia art installations, or "Happenings", which took place around the city at that time.

American artists notable for their contributions or influence to the Judson Dance Theater were painter Robert Rauschenberg, conceptual artists Robert Morris and Andy Warhol, and composer John Herbert McDowell. Choreographers who influenced the group included Merce Cunningham, Simone Forti, Anna Halprin, and James Waring, among others.

Artistic philosophy 
Yvonne Rainer's 'No Manifesto', in which she rejects any confines to technique, thrill, spectacle, glamour, or assumed space, is a prime example of many of the artistic intentions of the cooperative: a rejection of spectacular, virtuosic, narrative, and expressive choreographic approaches. The collective was a place for collaboration between artists in fields such as, dance, writing, film, music and multi-media.

Although the collective remained in this undefined state, several reoccurring themes and styles emerged from the work. Democratic structures, improvisation, and the emphasis of process over product all arose as underlying characteristics of the group. Everyday movement became inspiration for material in many of the pieces created, and some of the Judson Dance Theater artists used untrained performers and dancers. For example, Rainer taught "Trio A" to "anyone who wanted to learn it – skilled and unskilled, trained and untrained, professional and amateur," and allowed it to be freely taught to a wide range of people.

Legacy 
In 1964 when the company performances ceased, the legacy of the group continued as individual members continued to create work that upheld the group's fundamental philosophies. For instance, James Waring and his dancers continued presenting work, as well as original members and second generation Judson performers. Perhaps the most influential aspect of Judson's legacy was not the work they produced, but the lens through which they regarded their work, which promoted the concept that anything could be looked at as dance.

In 2012, 50 years after the first Judson Dance Theater performance, Danspace Project presented the series Platform 2012: Judson Now, which featured "work by Judson-era artists reflecting their current artistic interests and includ[ing] artists who influenced Judson pre-1962 and contemporary artists who claim Judson as a direct point of reference." In 2018, the Museum of Modern Art mounted a retrospective exhibition, Judson Dance Theater: The Work Is Never Done, which included the work of Yvonne Rainer, Deborah Hay, David Gordon, Lucinda Childs, Steve Paxton, and Trisha Brown, among others.

Influence
Developments in dance practice that can be traced back to the Judson Dance Theater include:

 Contact improvisation
 Dance improvisation
 Dance for camera

Performers

Some of the notable artists who were part of the Judson Dance Theater were:

 Trisha Brown
 Lucinda Childs
 Philip Corner
 Judith Dunn
 Malcolm Goldstein
 David Gordon
 Sally Gross

 Deborah Hay
 Fred Herko
 Tony Holder
 Meredith Monk
 Mary Overlie
 Aileen Passloff
 Steve Paxton

 Yvonne Rainer
 Arlene Rothlein
 Carolee Schneemann
 Valda Setterfield
 Elaine Summers
 James Waring

Source:

See also
 Dance of the United States
 Grand Union (dance group)
 Postmodern dance

References

Further reading
 Banes, Sally (1993) Democracy's Body: Judson Dance Theater, 1962-1964. Durham, North Carolina: Duke University Press. 
 Burt, Ramsay (2006) Judson Dance Theater: Performative Traces. New York: Routledge. 
 Chin, Daryl (2010) "Mistaken Identities, Part II"
 Janevsky, Ana and Lax, Thomas (2018) Judson Dance Theater: The Work Is Never Done (exhibition catalog) New York: Museum of Modern Art. 
 "The First Concert of Dance at the Judson Dance Theater"

External links
Judson Memorial Church Archive at Fales Library, New York University
Judson Dance Theater: The Work is Never Done, MoMA Audio, 2017.

Contemporary dance companies
Culture of New York City
Dance companies in New York City